The Gertner Institute for Epidemiology and Health Policy Research is an Israeli think tank for the Ministry of Health (Israel) founded by Mordechai Shani in Tel HaShomer in 1992. Eldad Katorza was named director in 2021.

References

 Think tanks based in Israel
Health think tanks